After a 1944 United States Mexico Treaty the Morelos Dam was built in 1950 across the Colorado River. The eastern half of the dam lies inside United States territory; but Mexico is responsible for all maintenance. The dam allows Mexico to divert its allotted water from the Colorado River to highly developed crop lands in the Mexicali, Mexico Valley. The Morelos Dam is the final dam on the Colorado River. It is run by the International Boundary and Water Commission (IBWC).

On March 23, 2014, an eight-week flood was begun with the opening of a gate at Morelos Dam. The goal is to rejuvenate a desert riparian habitat which naturalist Aldo Leopold explored in 1922 and described as "awesome jungles" and "lovely groves" in his memoir A Sand County Almanac.

The dam is noted as the location Chris McCandless crossed into Mexico by kayak.

References

External links
 IBWC Morelos Dam Information

Dams on the Colorado River
Dams in Arizona
Dams in Mexico
Dams of the Lower Colorado River Valley
Buildings and structures in Baja California
Buildings and structures in Yuma County, Arizona
Mexicali Municipality
Dams completed in 1950